Connor Clark Barron (born 29 August 2002) is a Scottish professional footballer who plays as a midfielder for Scottish Premiership side Aberdeen. He has also played for Brechin City and Kelty Hearts on loan.

Career
On 22 January 2022 Barron made his senior debut for Aberdeen, coming on as a half-time substitute in a 3–0 Scottish Cup victory against Edinburgh City. Two weeks earlier, he had signed a contract committing him to the Dons until 2024.

He has also represented Scotland at the under-16, under-17 and under-21 levels.

References

2002 births
Living people
Scottish footballers
Aberdeen F.C. players
Scottish Professional Football League players
Association football midfielders
Kelty Hearts F.C. players
Brechin City F.C. players
Scotland under-21 international footballers
Scotland youth international footballers
Footballers from Aberdeenshire